During the 1990–91 English football season, Tottenham Hotspur competed in the Football League First Division.

Season summary
Tottenham's league form was average at best: having stood in third place after 17 games, the club won only three of their next 21 league matches, slumping to tenth place in the final table. The club had better luck in the FA Cup: after defeating London arch-rivals (and that season's eventual champions) Arsenal in the semi-final, they defeated Nottingham Forest 2–1 in the final. As well as giving Tottenham their first post-Heysel European campaign (in the Cup Winners' Cup) and ending the club's seven-year trophy drought, the FA Cup win made Tottenham the first club to win the trophy eight times, although this record has since been surpassed by Arsenal and Manchester United.

The only downside of the FA Cup triumph was an injury to star midfielder Paul Gascoigne, who ruptured his cruciate ligaments in a tackle on Forest fullback Gary Charles early in the first half. The injury would put his transfer to Italian side Lazio on hold until the 1992–93 season. Gascoigne had earlier scored a tremendous free-kick in the 3–1 win against Arsenal in the semi-final (Gary Lineker scored Tottenham's other goals, with Arsenal's Alan Smith scoring Arsenal's goal).

Off the pitch the club were in danger of going into administration. With £20 million of debt (around £45 million equivalent in 2020) and shares in Tottenham Hotspur being suspended in the autumn of 1990, Irving Scholar resigned as Chairman of the club. In June 1991, manager Terry Venables and businessman, Alan Sugar, took over the club with equal shares and Alan Sugar being made chairman.

Kit
The FA Cup final saw Tottenham debut a longer style of shorts as part of their kit. Although the long shorts were ridiculed at first, within the decade all clubs in English football would have adopted the style.

Squad
Squad at end of season

Left club during season

Reserve squad

Results
Results courtesy of and Topspurs.

Pre-season

First Division

Results by matchday

Fixtures

FA Cup

League Cup

Transfers

Out
  Guy Butters -  Portsmouth
  Bobby Mimms -  Blackburn Rovers, December, £250,000

Statistics

Appearances and goals

{| class="wikitable" style="text-align:center"
|-
! rowspan="2" style="vertical-align:bottom;" | Pos.
! rowspan="2" style="vertical-align:bottom; width:240px" | Name
! colspan="2" style="width:85px;" | Premier League
! colspan="2" style="width:85px;" | FA Cup
! colspan="2" style="width:85px;" | EFL Cup
! colspan="2" style="width:85px;" | Total
|-
! Apps
! Goals
! Apps
! Goals
! Apps
! Goals
! Apps
! Goals
|-
| MF
| align="left" |  Paul Allen
|| 34+2 || 3 || 6 || 0 || 6 || 0 || 46+2 || 3
|-
| DF
| align="left" |  Guðni Bergsson
|| 9+3 || 1 || 0 || 0 || 0 || 0 || 9+3 || 1
|-
| GK
| align="left" |  Kevin Dearden
|| 0 || 0 || 0 || 0 || 1 || 0 || 1 || 0
|-
| DF
| align="left" |  Justin Edinburgh
|| 14+2 || 1 || 5 || 0 || 5 || 0 || 24+2 || 1
|-
| DF
| align="left" |  Terry Fenwick
|| 4 || 0 || 2 || 0 || 2 || 0 || 8 || 0
|-
| MF
| align="left" |  Peter Garland
|| 0+1 || 0 || 0 || 0 || 0 || 0 || 0+1 || 0
|-
| MF
| align="left" |  Paul Gascoigne
|| 26 || 7 || 6 || 6 || 4+1 || 6 || 36+1 || 19
|-
| FW
| align="left" |  Phil Gray
|| 3+3 || 0 || 0+1 || 0 || 0 || 0 || 3+4 || 0
|-
| DF
| align="left" |  Ian Hendon
|| 0+2 || 0 || 0 || 0 || 0 || 0 || 0+2 || 0
|-
| FW
| align="left" |  John Hendry
|| 2+2 || 2 || 0 || 0 || 0 || 0 || 2+2 || 2
|-
| MF
| align="left" |  David Howells
|| 29 || 4 || 4 || 0 || 6 || 0 || 39 || 4
|-
| FW
| align="left" |  Gary Lineker
|| 32 || 15 || 6 || 3 || 5 || 1 || 43 || 19
|-
| DF
| align="left" |  Gary Mabbutt
|| 35 || 2 || 6 || 1 || 6 || 0 || 47 || 3
|-
| MF
| align="left" |  John Moncur
|| 4+5 || 0 || 0 || 0 || 1+1 || 0 || 5+6 || 0
|-
| FW
| align="left" |  Paul Moran
|| 0+1 || 0 || 1 || 0 || 0 || 0 || 1+1 || 0
|-
| MF
| align="left" |  Nayim
|| 32+1 || 5 || 3+2 || 1 || 2+3 || 0 || 37+6 || 6
|-
| MF
| align="left" |  Vinny Samways
|| 14+9 || 1 || 4+1 || 0 || 4 || 0 || 22+10 || 1
|-
| MF
| align="left" |  Steve Sedgley
|| 33+1 || 0 || 4+1 || 0 || 4+2 || 0 || 41+4 || 0
|-
| MF
| align="left" |  Paul Stewart
|| 35 || 3 || 5 || 2 || 6 || 4 || 46 || 9
|-
| DF
| align="left" |  Mitchell Thomas
|| 23+8 || 0 || 2 || 0 || 4+1 || 0 || 29+9 || 0
|-
| GK
| align="left" |  Erik Thorstvedt
|| 37 || 0 || 6 || 0 || 5 || 0 || 48 || 0
|-
| DF
| align="left" |  Dave Tuttle
|| 4+2 || 0 || 0 || 0 || 0+1 || 0 || 4+3 || 0
|-
| DF
| align="left" |  Pat Van Den Hauwe
|| 31+1 || 0 || 5 || 0 || 2 || 0 || 38+1 || 0
|-
| GK
| align="left" |  Ian Walker
|| 1 || 0 || 0 || 0 || 0 || 0 || 1 || 0
|-
| FW
| align="left" |  Paul Walsh
|| 16+13 || 7 || 1+3 || 0 || 3+3 || 0 || 20+19 || 7
|-

Goal scorers

Clean sheets

References

Tottenham Hotspur F.C. seasons
Tottenham Hotspur